Qian Chen is a Chinese-American medical scientist who is currently the Michael G. Ehrlich Endowed Chair Professor in Orthopaedic Research at the Alpert Medical School, a part of Brown University.

References

Brown University faculty
Year of birth missing (living people)
Living people
Place of birth missing (living people)
Chinese emigrants to the United States
Medical researchers